Yakov Yakovlevich Brandt  (1869–1944, Beijing) was a Russian sinologist, diplomat, linguist and professor.

He graduated from the Saratov gymnasium. In 1892 he graduated from the Faculty of Oriental Languages at Saint Petersburg Imperial University. He worked as an officer on special assignments in the Ministry of Finance. He worked as a senior teacher at the Russian Language School at the Beijing Department of Management Chinese Eastern Railway. In 1901, Brandt became the head of the Beijing Department of Chinese Eastern Railway. In 1915, he became an Active State Councillor and developed projects for the development of Sinology education in Russia. After the October Revolution, he was a member of the Government (business office) of General L. D. Horvat in Vladivostok in 1918. He served as professor of the Institute of Russian Language and Law in Beijing from 1921–1924. Professor Yakov Brandt was the director of the Russian School of Chinese Language and deputy rector of the Harbin Law School. Most of his textbooks for learning Chinese and Russian were published by the Russian Ecclesiastical Mission in Beijing. He died in 1944 in Beijing. Professor Yakov Brandt, being the director of the Russian School of Chinese Language and Deputy Rector of the Harbin Law Institute, was the author of books such as «Почин. Опыт учебной хрестоматии для преподавания русскаго языка в начальных китайских школах». («Initiative. The experience of a textbook for teaching Russian language in primary Chinese schools.» 1906, 1910 - 1911), «Русско-Китайский Переводчик: сборник наиболее необходимых слов, выражений и фраз, преимущественно военного характера, с указанием китайских знаков и их произношения» («Russian-Chinese Translator: a collection of the most necessary words, expressions and phrases, mainly of a military nature, with an indication of Chinese characters and their pronunciation», 1906) and «Самоучитель китайского письменного языка» («Tutorial Chinese written language», 1914), considered for the first 20 years of 20th century as the best Russian Chinese educational materials.

Since 1925, Brandt began teaching at the North China Union Language School. The result of this activity of Brandt, after three semesters, was a textbook in English «Introduction to literary Chinese (漢文進階)», published in 1927, which was reprinted several times. In 1944, Brandt compiled and published the «English-Chinese Vocabulary».

Work

in Russian
 Брандт Я. Я. «Русско-Китайский Переводчик: сборник наиболее необходимых слов, выражений и фраз, преимущественно военного характера, с указанием китайских знаков и их произношения».(«Russian-Chinese Translator: a collection of the most necessary words, expressions and phrases, mainly of a military nature, with an indication of Chinese characters and their pronunciation») соч. Я. Брандта. 2-е изд. - Пекин, 1906.
 Брандт Я. Я. «Почин. Опыт учебной хрестоматии для преподавания русскаго языка в начальных китайских школах».(«Initiative. The experience of a textbook for teaching Russian language in primary Chinese schools.») / В 3 частях. Ч.3. Отд.1. Составил Яков Брандт. – Пекин, 1906.
 Брандт Я. Я. «Почин. Опыт учебной хрестоматии для преподавания русскаго языка в начальных китайских школах».(«Initiative. The experience of a textbook for teaching Russian language in primary Chinese schools.») / В 3 частях. Ч.1. Изд. второе. Составил Яков Брандт. – Пекин, 1906.
 Брандт Я. Я.  «Самоучитель китайского разговорного языка по методе Туссэна и Лангеншейдта» («Tutorial of Chinese spoken language according to the method of Toussaint and Langensheidt») / Сост. Я. Брандт, ст. преп. Шк. рус. яз. при Пекин. отд. Правл. Кит. Вост. ж. д. Ч. 1-. - Пекин : тип. Рус. духов. миссии, 1909. - 26.
 Брандт Я. Я. «Вдовствующая императрица Цы-си и Император Гуан-сюй» («Empress Dowager Cixi and Guangxu Emperor»). – Харбин, 1909.
 Брандт Я. Я. «Образцы китайскаго оффициальнаго языка с русским переводом и примечаниями = : 漢國之牘箋編» («Samples of Chinese official language with Russian translation and notes»)/ собрал и обработал Я. Брандт, старший преподаватель Школы китайской восточной ж. д. в Пекине. - Пекин : Тип. Усп. монастыря при Русской духовной миссии, Ч.1., 1910.
 Брандт Я. Я. «Дипломатические беседы» («Diplomatic conversations»): Текст кит. изд. с рус. пер., словами и примеч. / Я. Брандт. - Пекин : тип. Усп. монастыря при Рус. духов. миссии, 1911. - [1], 111 с.;
 Брандт Я. Я.  «Самоучитель китайского письменного языка» («Tutorial Chinese written language») / Сост. Я. Брандт. Т. 1. - Пекин : тип. Рус. духов. миссии, 1914. - 26. Т. 1. - 1914. - 4, 417 с. 
 Брандт Я. Я. Почин. «Опыт учебной хрестоматии для преподавания русскаго языка в начальных китайских школах» («Experience reading books for teaching Russian language in primary Chinese schools»). В 3 частях. Ч.1. Изд. пятое. Составил Яков Брандт. – Пекин, 1915.
 Брандт Я. Я. «Сборник трактатов России с Китаем (начиная с Кульджинского трактата 1851 г.): для чтения в Институте русского языка при Министерстве иностранных дел.» («Collection of treatises of Russia with China (starting from the Treaty of Kulja of 1851): for reading at the Russian Language Institute at the Ministry of Foreign Affairs») – Пекин, 1915.
 Брандт Я. Я. «За кем идти» («For whom to go») / Я. Бранд. - Харбин : Электро-тиро-лит. А. К. Бергут (сын), 1918. - 13 с
 Брандт Я. Я. «Обычныя письма =  : 俄文通用尺牍» («Ordinary  [Chinese] characters») / Я. Брандт. - Пекин : Типография Русской духовной миссии, 1924. - 2, 193, [2] с.;

in English
 Introduction to literary Chinese (漢文進階)./ Brandt, Jakov J./ Peiping. 1927
 Wenli particles (虛字指南)./ Brandt, Jakov J./ Peiping. 1929
 Modern Newspaper Chinese: progressive readings with vocabularies, notes and translations. / By J. J. Brandt, pp. xii + 321. Peiping: Henri Vetch, 1935.
 Introduction to Literary Chinese. By J. J. Brandt. Second edition. 9 × 6, pp. xi + 352. Peiping: Henri Vetch, 1936, 21s.
 Modern newspaper Chinese: progressive readings with vocabularies, notes and translations./ By J. J. Brandt, pp. xii + 321. Peiping: Henri Vetch, 1939.
 Introduction to spoken Chinese / J. J. Brandt. Peiping: Henri Vetch, 1940 - 240 p.
 Introduction to spoken Chinese / by J. J. Brandt. 1943
 «Introduction to literary Chinese»./ by Brandt, J. J., / — New York: Frederick Ungar Publishing Company. — 503 p. / (ca 1944)
 Brandt's English-Chinese Vocabulary . J. J. Brandt. Department of Oriental Studies, Yale Univ., 1944 .

References

Linguists from Russia
1869 births
1944 deaths
Russian untitled nobility